Amir Beyglu (also Romanized as Amīr Beyglū; also known as Amīr Beglū) is a village in Lisar Rural District, Kargan Rud District, Talesh County, Gilan Province, Iran. In accordance with the 2006 census, its population was 168, in 36 families.

References 

Populated places in Talesh County